Autoridad Reguladora de Servicios Públicos (ARESEP) (English Public Service Regulating Authority) is the Costa Rican government institution that is in charge of regulating prices for public services within the country.

These services include:
Public transportation services
Telecommunication services
Water and sewage services 
Post office and mail services
 Electricity Services

External links
Official site

Institutions of Costa Rica